Digesta may refer to:

 The book Digesta seu Pandectae, also called "Pandects", see Digest (Roman law)
 Food undergoing digestion